Teodor Andrault de Langeron (1804-1885) was the President of Warsaw.

1804 births
1885 deaths
People from Brest, Belarus
People from Brestsky Uyezd
Senators of the Russian Empire
Mayors of Warsaw
Government officials of Congress Poland
Recipients of the Order of St. Anna, 1st class
Recipients of the Order of St. Vladimir, 3rd class
Recipients of the Order of Saint Stanislaus (Russian), 1st class